Trinchera may refer to:

Dominick Trinchera, American mobster
Trinchera, Colorado, an unincorporated community in Las Animas County, Colorado
Trinchera Cave Archeological District in Las Animas County, Colorado
Trinchera Celeste, an independent supporters group of O'Higgins, a football club in the Primera División de Chile
Trinchera Creek, a tributary of the Rio Grande in Costilla County, Colorado
Trinchera Creek (Las Animas County, Colorado), a tributary of the Purgatoire River in southeastern Colorado
Trinchera Peak, a mountain in Colorado
Trinchera, an archaeological site on Pukara Mountain in Peru
Trincheras, a town and municipality in Sonora, Mexico
The Trincheras Formation, a geological formation in Colombia